Dmytro Osadchyi (born 20 March 1992) is a Ukrainian football midfielder who plays for Nyva-V Vinnytsia.

Osadchyi is product of youth team system FC Metalurh Zaporizhzhia.

He played in the Ukrainian Second League (FC Metalurh-2 Zaporizhzhia, FC Kremin Kremenchuk) and in the Ukrainian First League (FC Olimpik Donetsk clubs.

References

External links
 Profile at FFU Official Site (Ukr)
 

1992 births
Living people
Ukrainian footballers
FC Metalurh-2 Zaporizhzhia players
FC Kremin Kremenchuk players
FC Olimpik Donetsk players
FC Bukovyna Chernivtsi players

Association football midfielders
Footballers from Zaporizhzhia